2012 is the first year in the history of the Glory, an international kickboxing event. 2012 starts with Glory 1: Stockholm, and ends with Dream 18 & Glory 4: Tokyo. The events were broadcasts through television agreements with regional channels around the world.

List of events

Glory 1: Stockholm

Glory 1: Stockholm was a kickboxing event held on May 26, 2012 at the Ericsson Globe in Stockholm, Sweden.

Background
This event featured the world title fight for the inaugural Glory Heavyweight championship between Semmy Schilt and Errol Zimmerman as headliner. The event also featured qualification bouts for the Glory 70kg Slam Tournament.

Result

Glory 2: Brussels

Glory 2: Brussels was a kickboxing event held on October 6, 2012 at the Forest National in Brussels, Belgium.

Background
This event featured a super fight between Remy Bonjasky and Anderson Silva as headliner, Also this event featured non-tournament super fight series.

Result

Glory 3: Rome

Glory 3: Rome was a kickboxing event held on November 3, 2012 at the PalaLottomatica in Rome, Italy.

Background
This event featured the Glory 70kg Slam Tournament final 8 Quarter-finals, Semifinals and final. Albert Kraus withdrew from the tournament due to the flu and was replaced by Yoshihiro Sato.

Result

70kg Slam Tournament bracket

1 Albert Kraus withdrew from the tournament due to the flu and was replaced by Yoshihiro Sato.

Dream 18/Glory 4: Tokyo

GLORY Sports International presents Dream 18 & Glory 4 Tokyo ~ Special 2012 ~ New Year's Eve was a mixed martial arts and kickboxing hybrid event held on December 31, 2012 at the Saitama Super Arena in Saitama, Japan.

Background
Dream partnered with Glory Sports International for this event.

The GLORY kickboxing event featured a one-night, single-elimination 16-man Glory Heavyweight Grand Slam Tournament. The winner brought home a $400,000 first-place prize and the runner-up a $100,000 second-place prize. 
Semmy Schilt, the number one seed, defeated Daniel Ghiță, the number three seed, in the first round via knockout to win the tournament.

Result

Glory Heavyweight Grand Slam Tournament bracket

International broadcasting

References

Glory (kickboxing) events
2012 in kickboxing
2012 in mixed martial arts
Kickboxing in Sweden
Kickboxing in Italy
Dream (mixed martial arts) events
Sport in Saitama (city)
Mixed martial arts in Japan
Kickboxing in Japan
2012 in Japan